Hypercompe nemophila is a moth of the family Erebidae first described by Gottlieb August Wilhelm Herrich-Schäffer in 1853. It is found in Costa Rica, Guatemala, Peru and Venezuela.

References

Hypercompe
Moths described in 1853